Charles Anderson-Pelham, 1st Earl of Yarborough (8 August 1781 – 5 September 1846), styled Hon. Charles Anderson-Pelham from 1794 to 1823, was one of the founders of the Royal Yacht Squadron and its first Commodore. He lived at Appuldurcombe House on the Isle of Wight, which had been inherited by his wife Henrietta from her uncle, Sir Richard Worsley. He died aboard his yacht at Vigo in Spain in 1846. There are two monuments to him: one at Culver Down on the Isle of Wight and Pelham's Pillar at Caistor, Lincolnshire, England.

He was member of parliament (MP) for Great Grimsby from 1803 until his re-election in 1807 was overturned on petition in 1808, and for Lincolnshire from 1807 to 1823.

His younger son, Dudley Pelham, was a naval commander and politician.

References

External links 
 

Sailors from the Isle of Wight
Anderson-Pelham, Charles
Anderson-Pelham, Charles
Anderson-Pelham, Charles
Anderson-Pelham, Charles
Anderson-Pelham, Charles
Anderson-Pelham, Charles
Anderson-Pelham, Charles
Anderson-Pelham, Charles
Yarborough, Charles Anderson-Pelham, 1st Earl of
1
1781 births
1846 deaths
Peers of the United Kingdom created by William IV